Lasse Paakkonen (born 8 July 1986 in Raahe) is a Finnish cross-country skier who has been competing since he was seven years old. He finished tenth in the team sprint event at the 2010 Winter Olympics in Vancouver, British Columbia, Canada.

Paakkonen's best World Cup finish was 15th in an individual sprint event at Germany in 2009. Although concentrating in the sprint event, he has also won National Championship medals in long-distance events.

Lasse Paakkonen lives in Jyväskylä, Finland. He studies in the University of Jyväskylä School of Business with Marketing as his major.

Cross-country skiing results
All results are sourced from the International Ski Federation (FIS).

Olympic Games

World Cup

Season standings

References

External links 

 Lasse Paakkonen official home page

1986 births
Living people
People from Raahe
Cross-country skiers at the 2010 Winter Olympics
Finnish male cross-country skiers
Olympic cross-country skiers of Finland
Sportspeople from North Ostrobothnia
21st-century Finnish people